Statistics of Belgian League in season 1985–86.

Overview

It was performed by 18 teams, and R.S.C. Anderlecht won the championship, while K. Waterschei S.V. Thor Genk & Lierse S.K. were relegated.

League standings

Results

Topscorers

References

Belgian Pro League seasons
Belgian
1